The Owl and the Pussycat is the soundtrack album to the 1970 American film of the same name. It was released by Columbia Records on December 19, 1970 and features dialogue from the film by Barbra Streisand and George Segal recorded over music performed by American band Blood, Sweat & Tears. The album's five tracks were all written by Buck Henry, produced by Thomas Z. Shepard, and later released by Blood, Sweat & Tears in stripped down instrumental versions on their 2013 compilation album Rare, Rarer & Rarest. An 8-track cartridge edition and cassette tape edition of The Owl and the Pussycat was also distributed, featuring four songs instead of five.

The soundtrack's songs are influenced by rock music and big band-style tunes. The Owl and the Pussycat was critiqued for Streisand's inclusion of talking rather than singing. However, critics felt the music paired nicely with the dialogue. Commercially, the album only charted in the United States and Canada. On the Billboard 200, it peaked at number 186, becoming Streisand's lowest-charting entry from her entire career, although it served as Segal's highest charting effort.

Background and songs 
The Owl and the Pussycat was released to movie theaters on November 3, 1970, by Columbia Pictures. The accompanying soundtrack was released on vinyl and 8-track cartridge on December 19 of the same year through Columbia Records, featuring five tracks of dialogue spoken by cast members Barbra Streisand and George Segal recorded over music performed by American band Blood, Sweat & Tears. They created the instrumentals for the film while touring shortly before band member and lead vocalist, David Clayton-Thomas, departed the group. This was Clayton-Thomas's first film score credit, and he considered the work as being difficult because he was tasked with placing music over preexisting dialogue. He wrote: "Somebody should have told me what can happen when you do a film score. When the picture is completed, the powers that be can do what they want with the score."  The record's five song titles correlate with different scenes in the film and are primarily rock-influenced.

The soundtrack's creation was headed by Richard Halligan, who composed and arranged the selections. Screenwriter Buck Henry is credited with writing all five album tracks while Thomas Z. Shepard served as the album's sole producer. Rather than the five songs individually, the 8-track cartridge edition of the soundtrack features four consecutive parts of a track called "Highlights from Buck Henry's Hilarious Screenplay". On July 2, 2013, Blood, Sweat & Tears released a compilation album titled Rare, Rarer & Rarest, featuring all five of the tracks on The Owl and the Pussycat in their original, instrumental form.

Reception 

Criticism towards the soundtrack was aimed at the absence of Streisand's vocals. AllMusic's William Ruhlmann awarded The Owl and the Pussycat 1.5 out of 5 stars. He suggested that the soundtrack was Streisand's least successful because the album's songs featured the singer talking and enduring in "endless bickering" instead of actually singing and performing with live vocals. The staff members at Billboard noted the influence of rock and big band-style music and wrote that "the music that is heard [...] fits in with the dialogue quite well". Concluding, they wrote: "the dialog itself runs the gamut from absurdly sublime material to simply ridiculous material".

In the United States, the album debuted at the bottom position on the Billboard 200 chart on February 6, 1971. It later peaked at number 186, becoming Streisand's lowest-charting entry of her entire career, behind 1967's A Christmas Album and 1970's On a Clear Day You Can See Forever, which both peaked at number 108. However, the soundtrack fared better for Segal, as his previous highest-peaking record was The Yama Yama Man, which peaked at number 199 in September 1967. On Canada's Top Albums chart conducted and published by RPM, The Owl and the Pussycat debuted at number 85 during the week ending January 16, 1971. It eventually peaked at number 74.

Track listing 
All tracks written by Buck Henry and produced by Thomas Z. Shepard.

Personnel 
Credits adapted from the liner notes of The Owl and the Pussycat.

 Barbra Streisand dialogue
 George Segal dialogue
 Blood, Sweat & Tears music
 Richard Halligan composer, arranger
 Buck Henry writer

 Al Hirschfield illustrations
 Arthur Kendy engineering
 Steve Schiffman liner notes
 Thomas Z. Shepard producer

Charts

Release history

References

Bibliography

External links 
 

1970 soundtrack albums
Barbra Streisand soundtracks
Blood, Sweat & Tears albums
Columbia Records soundtracks